Shayne Paul Corson (born August 13, 1966) is a Canadian former professional hockey player who played in the National Hockey League (NHL) for the Montreal Canadiens, Edmonton Oilers, St. Louis Blues, Toronto Maple Leafs, and Dallas Stars. During his NHL career, Corson battled both ulcerative colitis and, as detailed in the October 22, 2001, issue of Sports Illustrated, panic attacks. He last played in the 2003–04 season. Despite some speculation to the contrary, Corson did not return to the NHL after the 2004–05 lockout and is now retired.

Background and early career
Corson was born in Midland, Ontario. As a youth, he played in the 1979 Quebec International Pee-Wee Hockey Tournament with a minor ice hockey team from Barrie. He played in the Ontario Hockey League (OHL) for the Brantford Alexanders (1983–1984) and Hamilton Steelhawks (1984–1986). The Montreal Canadiens drafted him in the first round, eighth overall, of the 1984 NHL Entry Draft. He played briefly with the Canadiens in the 1985–86 season, then joined the team full-time the following year.

NHL playing career
Corson was a regular contributor for the Canadiens from 1986 until 1992, when he was traded to the Edmonton Oilers in exchange for Vincent Damphousse. He played with Edmonton for three full seasons before joining the St. Louis Blues. His time in Edmonton was marred by some controversy, as head coach George Burnett chose him as the team's captain during the 1994–95 season (Jan.-Mar.1995). Burnett would later strip Corson of the captaincy. He was signed by the Blues as a free agent in 1995, and the Oilers received the rights to Curtis Joseph as compensation. During the 1996–97 season, the Blues traded him back to Montreal, where he played until 2000. The Toronto Maple Leafs then signed him as a free agent, and he spent three full seasons in Toronto before "resigning" in the middle of the post-season partly because of his ulcerative colitis.

In a particularly fierce 2002 Stanley Cup playoffs series against the New York Islanders, Corson was involved in a fight with Eric Cairns, with Cairns being the clear winner of the bout. During the official's attempt to separate Cairns and Corson after the fight, Corson attempted to kick Cairns. The NHL subsequently suspended Corson for the deciding seventh game of the series. The Dallas Stars signed him during the last part of the 2003–04 season in order to add some grit and leadership for their playoff run, but the team was unsuccessful (losing in the first round to the Colorado Avalanche), and Corson retired afterwards.

Notable achievements
Shayne Corson captained two NHL clubs during his 19-season professional career. He has also played for Canada at the Canada Cup, World Junior Ice Hockey Championships, World Cup of Hockey and 1998 Winter Olympics. Corson was known as a gritty player, with good instincts both offensively and defensively. Corson represented his teams three times at the NHL All-Star Game. He scored 693 points and earned 2357 penalty minutes during his 1,156-game regular season NHL career. In addition, he scored 87 points and earned 291 penalty minutes in 140 playoff games.

Personal life
Corson suffers from ulcerative colitis, a chronic digestive disorder that can cause severe pain and significant weight loss. During the later stages of his career, Corson began to suffer from panic attacks, a condition he has not attributed to any single event, but which may have been precipitated by his battles with colitis and the premature death of his father, Paul Corson, from throat cancer in 1993.

Corson's sister Shannon is married to his former Toronto Maple Leaf teammate Darcy Tucker. In retirement, Corson (often with Tucker) has been a prominent proponent of building a cancer care facility, the Simcoe-Muskoka Regional Cancer Centre, as part of Barrie's Royal Victoria Hospital.

Corson opened his first restaurant in 2007 with partner Armando Russo in the Distillery District of Toronto, called Tappo Wine Bar & Restaurant. They opened a second restaurant in Barrie, Ontario, named Corson's, which began as a family restaurant but was converted to a sports bar and grill which displays his jerseys and other hockey memorabilia but has since closed. (Mom's Pantry, an older restaurant in Barrie, was opened by Shayne Corson's father but is no longer run by the Corson family.)

Corson's daughter, Willow Corson, currently plays hockey at Boston College, in the NCAA.

Awards and honours
 All-Star selection, forward, 1986 World Junior Ice Hockey Championships
 3× NHL All-Star Game: 1990, 1994 and 1998

Career statistics

Regular season and playoffs

International

See also
 List of NHL players with 1000 games played
 List of NHL players with 2000 career penalty minutes
 List of people diagnosed with ulcerative colitis

References

External links

Profile at hockeydraftcentral.com
Shayne Corson Official Website

1966 births
Living people
Brantford Alexanders players
Canadian ice hockey left wingers
Dallas Stars players
Edmonton Oilers players
Hamilton Steelhawks players
Ice hockey people from Ontario
Ice hockey players at the 1998 Winter Olympics
Montreal Canadiens draft picks
Montreal Canadiens players
National Hockey League All-Stars
National Hockey League first-round draft picks
Olympic ice hockey players of Canada
People from Midland, Ontario
St. Louis Blues players
Toronto Maple Leafs players